

The Martin N2M was a prototype American primary training biplane, built for the United States Navy by the Glenn L. Martin Company. It was never accepted by the Navy and only the prototype was built.

The prototype was designated N2M-1 by the United States Navy, and it first flew in 1924. The N2M-1 was based on the Martin 66 Night Mail and was a biplane powered by a  Wright-Hisso E-4 engine. It had two open cockpits in tandem for a crew of two.

Specifications

See also

References

Notes

Bibliography

 

N2M
1920s United States military trainer aircraft
Single-engined tractor aircraft
Biplanes